Barbara Nadel is an English crime-writer. Many of her books are set in Turkey, others in London's East End. She is best known for her Istanbul-set Çetin İkmen novels.

Background
Born in the East End of London, Barbara Nadel trained as an actress before becoming a writer. Now writing full-time, she has previously worked as a public relations officer for the National Schizophrenia Fellowship's Good Companion Service and as a mental health advocate for the mentally disordered in a psychiatric hospital. She has also worked with sexually abused teenagers and taught psychology in schools and colleges, and was the patron of The Acorn Group in Shrewsbury, a charity (now apparently closed following a cut in funding) caring for those in emotional and mental distress.

She has been a regular visitor to Turkey for more than 25 years.

Until late 2014, Nadel lived in "the wilds of the north of England" with her husband and six axolotls, her "very demanding Persian cat" having died on 23 December 2011, but then moved from the Pennines to "a small village in Essex just outside London". Her son is a published academic.

Writing
Nadel is best known for her series about Çetin İkmen, a chain-smoking and hard-drinking detective on the Istanbul police force, and his colleagues Mehmet Süleyman,  Balthazar Cohen, and Armenian pathologist Arto Sarkissian. These have been translated into a number of languages, including Turkish, and have been released as audiobooks in English and German.

Her second crime series, set in West Ham in the East End of London, during The Blitz, features undertaker Francis Hancock.

In January 2011, Quercus announced the signing of Ms Nadel to write a new crime series set in the modern-day East End, to be published starting Summer 2012 under the name B J Nadel, although the published book A Private Business, was ultimately credited to Barbara Nadel. The book, and its sequels, focuses on private investigator Lee Arnold and his Muslim assistant Mumtaz Hakim. Publication moved to Allison & Busby from the fifth book in the series.

Other published works include short stories in Ellery Queen's Mystery Magazine, plus British magazines (My Weekly and Woman's Own), and travel pieces for British newspapers (The Guardian, The Sunday Times, The Independent), and the US food magazine Saveur.

Awards
2005 winner of the CWA Silver Dagger  (for Deadly Web)

2006 winner of Jury magazine's Flintyxan ("Flint Axe") award for Best Historical Crime Novel (for Dödlig rättvisa, Marianne Alstermark's Swedish translation of Last Rights)

2008 winner of the London Borough of Redbridge "Big Red Read" Book of the Year for Ashes to Ashes

2010 winner of the London Borough of Redbridge "Big Red Read" Crime Fiction of the Year for Sure and Certain Death

2013 Derringer Finalist for short story "Nain Rouge", published in Ellery Queen's Mystery Magazine

Bibliography

Çetin İkmen
Published by Headline
Belshazzar's Daughter (1999)
A Chemical Prison (aka The Ottoman Cage) (2000)
Arabesk (2001)
Deep Waters (2002)
Harem (2003)
Petrified (2004)
Deadly Web (2005)
Dance With Death (2006)
A Passion for Killing (2007)
Pretty Dead Things (2007)
River of the Dead (2009)
Death by Design (2010)
A Noble Killing (2011)
Dead of Night (2012)
Deadline (2013)
Body Count (2014)
Land of the Blind (2015)
On the Bone (2016)
The House of Four (2017)
Incorruptible (2018)
A Knife to the Heart (2019)
Blood Business (2020)<ref>{{Cite web|title=Blood Business (Ikmen Mystery 22) by Barbara Nadel - Books|url=https://www.hachette.com.au/barbara-nadel/blood-business-ikmen-mystery-22|access-date=2020-06-11|website=www.hachette.com.au}}</ref>Forfeit (2021)Bride Price (2022)

Francis Hancock
Published by HeadlineLast Rights (2005)After the Mourning (2006)Ashes to Ashes (2008)Sure and Certain Death (2009)

Hakim & Arnold
Published by QuercusA Private Business (2012)An Act of Kindness (2013)Poisoned Ground (2014)Enough Rope (2015)
Published by Allison & Busby

Adaptations
In June 2020, it was announced that Miramax TV and ViacomCBS International Studios would produce a television adaptation of the Çetin İkmen novels entitled The Turkish Detective''.

By April 2022, the project was greenlit for a full series of eight episodes, to be released on Paramount+. The series will be written by  Ben Schiffer, and directed by Niels Arden Oplev. Acclaimed Turkish actor Haluk Bilginer will star as İkmen, alongside Ethan Kai as Mehmet Süleyman, and Yasemin Allen as Ayşe Farsakoğlu.

References

Further reading

External links
International Crime Authors Reality Check
Shotsmag Profile
Fantastic Fiction profile
Tangled Web profile
Meet the Author (video) 2004
CWA Gold and Silver Daggers 2005
London Borough of Redbridge Big Red Read
Wikipedia SE entry for the Flintyxan, in Swedish
bokrecension.se entry for Marianne Alstermark, in Swedish
2013 Derringer nomination

Year of birth missing (living people)
Living people
English crime fiction writers
English women novelists
Women mystery writers
Writers from London
20th-century English novelists
20th-century English women writers
21st-century English novelists
21st-century English women writers